The Journal of International Students is a quarterly, peer-reviewed, academic journal covering research on international students in tertiary education, secondary education, and other educational settings that make significant contributions to research, policy, and practice in the internationalization of education worldwide. JIS is part of the Star Scholars Network's Open Journals in Education

Publication history
The Journal of International Students (JIS) was established in 2011 and is published on the Open Journals in Education (OJED) network by Krishna Bista while at Arkansas State University, now at  Morgan State University. and the  editor-in-chief is  Chris R. Glass of   Old Dominion University

Abstracting and indexing
The Journal of International Students (JIS)  is abstracted and indexed in Scopus. JIS is a Gold Open Access journal.

References

External links

Quarterly journals
English-language journals
Routledge academic journals
Education journals
Publications established in 2011
2011 establishments in the United States